Kohl Island may refer to the following places:

Kohl Island (Alaska)
Kohl Island (British Columbia)